Cirrus fibratus or also called Cirrus filosus  is a species of cirrus cloud. The name cirrus fibratus is derived from Latin, meaning "fibrous". These clouds are similar to cirrus uncinus, commonly known as "mares' tails"; however, fibratus clouds do not have tufts or hooks at the end. The filaments are usually separate from one another.

Like other cirrus clouds, cirrus fibratus occur at high altitudes. They can indicate an approaching warm front; however, they can also be an indication that fair weather will follow.

See also
List of cloud types

References

External links
International Cloud Atlas - Cirrus fibratus

Cirrus